Iere High School is one of five Presbyterian secondary schools in Trinidad and Tobago, and it is notably the only coeducational of the five. Iere has gained over 50 academic scholarships over its establishment in 1955. The school is usually a First-choice secondary school by primary school students when writing their SEA The school requires at least over 85% in the Secondary Entrance Examination.

Principals
 Rev. E. T. Lute  (founder)
 Mr. Weldon Grant (1955 - 1961)
 Miss Constance Wager (1961- 1964)
 Rev. Cyrill F. Beharry (1964 - 1981)
 Mr. Charles Sinanan (1981 - 1994)
 Mr. Sooksargar Babooram (1995 - 1999)
 Mr. Irving Hoosanie (1999 - 2001)
 Dr. Michael R. Dowlath (2001 - 2006)
 Mr. Roy Ramlogan (2006-2012)
 Mr Deraj Sookdeo (2012)
 Mr. Roy Nandlal (2012 - present)

Buildings
 Auditorium - newly expanded, refurbished and fully air conditioned
 Science laboratory 
 Main Block - houses forms 1-4, Administrative Office, Samsung Smartroom & Computer Lab
 Arts Building 
 Rev. House
 New broken air conditioned block located on the northern end of the campus - houses forms 5&6, Library, Language room, TD room and new staffroom

Sporting facilities
 Courtyard (newly expanded and covered) houses: Basketball court, Volleyball court, Badminton court, and Lawn-tennis capabilities (though not engaged).
 Football Field referred to as Upper Field 
 Cricket Field referred to as Lower Field 
 Cricket nets (located on lower field)
 Football nets (located on lower field)
Ramcharan won the most sports day currently at 25 wins

Notable alumni
The Kamla Persad-Bissessar, former Prime Minister of Trinidad and Tobago, is a former student of the institution as well as Members of Parliament Dhanraj Singh, Glen Ramadarsingh, Stacy Roopnarine and Nicole Oliviere. This also includes former president, Anthony Carmona.

External links

Secondary schools in Trinidad and Tobago
Educational institutions established in 1955
1955 establishments in the British Empire